Jamaican inventions and discoveries are items, processes, ideas, techniques or discoveries which owe their existence either partially or entirely to a person born in Jamaica, or to a citizen of Jamaica or to a person born abroad of Jamaican heritage.

Agricultural machinery 

Invention (of the first) sorrel harvesting machine that facilitates the mechanical stripping of the red calyces flesh from the sorrel plant.

Animal breeding 

 Jamaica Hope, Jamaica Red and Jamaica Black, by Thomas Lecky.

Astronomy and astrophysics 
Mercedes Richards was the first to:

make images of the gravitational flow of gas between the stars in any interacting binary.
image the chromospheres and accretion disks in Algol binaries.
apply the technique of tomography, in astronomy.
make theoretical hydrodynamic simulations of the Algol binary stars.
discover starspots on the cool star in an Algol binary.
apply novel distance correlation statistical methods to large astronomical databases.

Chemistry 

 The "armed-disarmed" principle in glycosylation chemistry, by Bertram Fraser-Reid. 
 Construction of the largest ever synthetic hetero-oligosaccharide without the use of automated methods, by Bertram Fraser-Reid.
Isolation of dibenzyl trisulphide (DTS) from the guinea hen weed and identification of anti-proliferation and/or cytotoxic activity on a wide range of cancer cell lines, by Williams and Levy.
Identification of DTS derivatives (e.g. DTS-albumin complexes) for providing anti-proliferation and/or cytotoxic activity on a wide range of cancer cell lines, by Williams and Levy.  
Development of methods of isolating and/or providing DTS and/or its derivatives in an effective amount for providing an anti-proliferation and/or cytotoxic activity on cancer cell lines, by Williams and Levy. 
 Isolation of chemical compounds from the ball moss plant and identification of anti-cancer activity, by Henry Lowe.
 Isolation of eryngial from eryngium foetidum and Identification as an anti-threadworm agent by Reese, Robinson and Forbes.

Computing 

 Invention of the Lingo programming language used in Adobe Director, by John Henry Thompson.
Methods and apparatus for managing mobile content, co-invented by John Henry Thompson.
Walt W. Braithwaite led the development of CAD/CAM systems at Boeing, enabling airplanes to be designed and manufactured digitally. He also made a significant contribution to the development of the Initial Graphics Exchange Specification (IGES). Braithwaite's common data format and translators from Boeing were used as the basis for developing the IGES protocol.
IBM Master Inventor, Tyrone W A Grandison, holds over 47 patents. He has co-invented product initiatives in RFID data management, privacy-preserving mobile data management, private social network analysis, text analytics and healthcare management systems.

Cuisine 
 Peanut drops
 Coconut cake
 Almond drops
 Chocolate Milk
 Tia Maria
Hummingbird cake
 Irish Moss
 Jerk
Busta candy
Coconut drop
Toto

Fashion 
 Kariba suit, by Ivy Ralph
Ursula Andress white bikini, co-designed by Tessa Prendergast

Games 
Nubian Jak, by Jak Beula Dodd
Automated Double-Dutch jump rope machine, by Tahira Reid Smith
Kivi (2016), co-designed by Sheyla Bonnick
Eye Catch (2017), co-designed by Sheyla Bonnick
Sneak Peek (2018), co-designed by Sheyla Bonnick
Kalooki
Popongo, by Errol Anderson

Health and medicine 

Monamycin antibiotic, co-discovered by Kenneth E. Magnus.
Discovery of kwashiorkor, by Cicely Williams. She was the first to recognize and conduct research on kwashiorkor and differentiate it from other dietary deficiencies. Williams also developed a treatment regime to combat the disease.
The pioneer of treatments for paediatric sickle cell anaemia, by Yvette Francis-McBarnette. She was the first to use prophylactic antibiotics in the treatment of children with sickle cell.
Canasol, a medicated eye-drop for the treatment of glaucoma by Manley West and  Albert Lockhart. Canasol reduces the fluid pressure within the eye that is present in late-stage glaucoma.
Asmasol, a treatment for bronchial asthma, coughs and colds, by West and Lockhart.
 The JaipurKnee, a budget-friendly prosthetic knee joint, co-designed by Joel Sadler. The device was listed at number 18 in Time Magazine's “50 Best Inventions of 2009. The JaipurKnee is made of self-lubricating, oil-filled nylon and is both flexible and stable, even on irregular terrain. The JaipurKnee has since been exported to many countries.
 The (Ramphal) Cardiac Surgery Simulator, by Dr Paul Ramphal and Dr Daniel Coore. The model is used in the training of many cardiothoracic surgery residents in the United States.
Alpha Prostate, a supplement used in the management of prostate health, by Henry Lowe.

Ideology, religion and ethics 
 Rastafarianism
Garveyism
Kumina
Myal 
Stuart Hall was one of the founding figures of the school of thought that is now known as British Cultural Studies or the Birmingham School of Cultural Studies.
The League of Coloured Peoples (LCP), founded by Harold Moody.

Industrial processes 
 Invention of the Barley Abrasion Process, by Sir Geoff Palmer. A patented technique that speeds up the production of malt from grain and which is used by the British brewing industry.
 Sir Geoff Palmer was also the first person to utilise the scanning electron microscope to study malt production in detail.
Development of a commercial process to extract quassinoids from bitterwood, by Yee and Jacobs.
Invention of a process for extracting valuable mineral by-products from bauxite, by Lightbourne and Barclay Baetz.

Mathematics 

 The creation of a "sophisticated" mathematical cost capability trade-off model for HMS Queen Elizabeth, by Nira Chamberlain.
 Invention of a method of long multiplication, used in some UK schools, by Nira Chamberlain.

Music 
 Reggae
 Rocksteady
 Ska
Mento
Dub 
Dancehall
Ragga
Reggae fusion
Hip-hop/rap music. Jamaican-born DJ Kool Herc is Known as the "Founder of Hip-hop" and "Father of Hip-hop".
Modern remixing of sounds.

Plants, crops and botany 

 The Ortanique, by David Daniel Phillips.
Discovery of a new variety of Zingiberaceae, by Errol McGhie.
 A transgenic papaya - Paula Tennant manipulated the genetic make-up of the local papaya and produced a new bioengineered variety resistant to the papaya ringspot Virus (PRSV).
 Discovery of a new species of Pisoniae.

Space exploration 

 Invention of a system and method for portable nondestructive examination with realtime three-dimensional tomography. Robert Rashford co-created the world's first portable 3D non-destructive evaluation (NDE) system. The NDE system detects flaws in materials used to construct aircraft, spacecraft and industrial pipelines without having to take these materials apart. The system was used in the maintenance of the United States Government's Hubble Space Telescope.
 Protective enclosure for use transporting orbital replacement units (orus) within a space craft, invented by Robert Rashford.
 Single-person spacecraft, co-invented by Robert Rashford.
 Enclosure for spaceflight hardware, co-invented by Robert Rashford.
 Robert Rashford also designed and developed unique spacecraft support systems for the Upper Atmosphere Research Satellite (UARS) Airborne Support Equipment (UASE) at the Orbital Sciences Corporation (OSC). At General Electric, he designed and tested a variety of spacecraft for both commercial and military applications. At Bechtel Corporation, he designed a nuclear reactor support structure. He has designed numerous highly complex engineering systems that successfully flew on board NASA's Manned Space Flight Programs.

Transport 

 Radial tyres, Jamaican-born Arthur William Savage is often cited as the inventor.
Invention relating to an improved process for making inner tubes for vehicle tires, by Arthur William Savage.

Weaponry 

 Invention of the Savage Model 99 lever-action rifle, by Jamaican-born Arthur William Savage.
Invention of the first completely modern removable box magazine, by Arthur William Savage.

Miscellaneous 

 Discovery of previously unknown historical human migration patterns, by Neil Hanchard and team.
Identification of more than 3 million genetic variants that had not been previously observed, which could contribute to making genetic tests more accurate for people with African ancestry, Neil Hanchard and team.
Invention of a connector system, by Glen McFarlane.
 Invention of the Compact Design H2 Energy Storage and Generation system.
 Patented magnetic gearbox system.
 Contributed to the development of a new type of polyhexahydrotriazine (PHT).
 Published the first comprehensive human microbiome study, by Karen Nelson and team.

 Identified the link between adipose tissue glucose transporter (GLUT4) and insulin resistance, by Evan Dale Abel and Barbara Kahn.

References 

Jamaican
Inventions
Inventions and discoveries